JTS may refer to:
 Alfa Romeo JTS engine, an automobile engine
 Java Topology Suite (JTS Topology Suite), a software library
 Janesville Transit System, Wisconsin, US
 Jakarta Taipei School, Indonesia
 Java transaction service, a software library
 Jewish Theological Seminary of America, New York City
 Jimmy Two-Shoes, a Canadian animated series
 Journal of Transatlantic Studies
 Journal of Traumatic Stress, US
 JT Storage, a d=former US hard drive manufacturer
 Jabhat Tahrir Souriya (Syrian Liberation Front), an Islamist group in the Syrian Civil War